Karl Schröder is a retired West German slalom canoeist who competed from the mid-1950s to the mid-1960s. He won a bronze medal in the folding K-1 team event at the 1957 ICF Canoe Slalom World Championships in Augsburg.

References

External links 
 Karl SCHRÖDER at CanoeSlalom.net

German male canoeists
Possibly living people
Year of birth missing
Place of birth missing
Medalists at the ICF Canoe Slalom World Championships